Steven Ainsworth Lonergan (29 March 1899 – June 1969) was an Australian public servant, who spent most of his career in the Territory of Papua and New Guinea. He served in the Legislative Council from 1952 to 1959.

Biography
Lonergan was born in Hobart in Tasmania in March 1899, and was educated at State High School in Launceston. He joined the Australian armed forces during World War I and saw action the Battle of Gallipoli aged only 16 and later in France, where he was badly injured. He then served in the Australian army headquarters in London. After the war he studied at the Repatriation Trades School in Launceston from 1920 to 1922, before  joining the civil service in the Territory of New Guinea in 1923. He married Norfolk Islander Irene Mitchell in February 1929.

In 1940 he was appointed Assistant Government Secretary in 1940. During World War II he was part of the Australian New Guinea Administrative Unit, achieving the rank of lieutenant-colonel and was mentioned in dispatches. He became Acting Government Secretary in 1949, and in 1951 took on the role permanently. As a result, he was appointed to the Legislative Council in 1952.

The Secretary Department was scrapped in 1955 and Lonergan became Director of Civil Affairs. He was also Acting Assistant Administrator for five months in 1956–57. He retired in 1959 and returned to Australia. He died in Sydney in 1969, survived by his wife.

References

1899 births
People from Hobart
Australian military personnel of World War I
Australian public servants
Territory of New Guinea people
Territory of Papua and New Guinea people
Papua New Guinean civil servants
Australian Army personnel of World War II
Members of the Legislative Council of Papua and New Guinea
1969 deaths
Australian colonels